This is a list of drag groups, which are groups of drag performers. A drag performer is a person who dresses in clothes associated with the sex or gender they do not identify with for special occasions to perform and entertain or engage in social activism. Many, but not all, drag performers are members of the LGBTQ+ community.

Performers

See also
List of drag queens
List of drag kings

References

External links
 List of Drag Performers at draglistings.com

Drag (clothing)-related lists

groups